Bellegarde is a French-speaking hamlet in the rural municipality of Storthoaks No. 31, in the Canadian province of Saskatchewan, established in 1898. Bellegarde is located just south of Highway 13 or Red Coat Trail near the Manitoba border and in south eastern Saskatchewan. Cannington Manor Provincial Historic park and Moose Mountain Provincial park are near Bellegarde. This hamlet is just south of the Canadian Pacific Railway. Being a hamlet with fewer than 100 people, the population is counted within the population count of the rural municipality.

History 
In July 1888 when Rev. Jean Gaire, a newly arrived young priest from France, founded the parish of Grande-Clairière in Manitoba, St. Maurice of Bellegarde did not exist. By 1891, under the guidance of Father Jean-Isidoire Gaire, settlers residing in Grande-Clairière took homesteads at what they called, "La Quatrième Coulée" or the Fourth Creek.

In 1892, they left full of enthusiasm to settle the Quatrième Coulée with bags and luggage, oxen and plows. After a failed attempt to clear farmland, they returned to Grande-Clairière discouraged.

At the same time, under the direction of Father Gaire, settlers advanced 25 to 30 miles to the west and six miles south, founding the mission of St. Raphael. On his return, Mgr Gaire discovered that Cyrille Sylvestre had taken four homesteads at the Quatrième Coulée with the intention of settling there permanently with his family.

In 1892, more settlers travelled to the Quatrième Coulée. After careful studies from all points of view, these  farmers recognized the  value in the land. The area quickly won recruits.

In 1889, families arriving at Grande Clairière from Luxembourg, Belgium took up homesteads at St. Maurice.

During the winter of 1893, the Jean-Baptiste Moreau family was the first family to spend the winter as isolated settlers in this area.

In 1894, the Moreau family was joined by other settlers who stayed to break the land. Soon others arrived to reinforce the colony. By 1897–1898, 110 settlers worked and prospered around St. Maurice de Bellegarde.

In 1900, four families from Chicago arrived.

Demographics 

Education

History
In 1903, Mr. Jobin was the first teacher. The rectory served as the school and initially only French was taught.
The Sisters of the Cross came to Bellegarde in 1905. They looked after the boarding  facilities and taught French and Catholic education for both boys and girls. From France, the Parish of St. Maurice welcomed the services of Sister Salvinie-Eugénie and  Sister Thaisie-Marie. Miss A. Boileau taught English.

Mr. Honoré George built the first convent soon after. By fall, it took in its first boarder, Emilia  Renard.

By 1912, the rectory served as a dormitory for the boys, supervised by Rev. Napoléon Poirier and Sister Thérèse-Eugénie was in charge of the convent. She encouraged the construction of a new and larger facility which was finished in 1919. The Sisters taught in this school until 1961.

Today
École de Bellegarde, Prématernelle - 12e année. École Francophone.

See also

 List of communities in Saskatchewan
 List of hamlets in Saskatchewan
 Organized hamlet
 Block settlement

References

External links

Storthoaks No. 31, Saskatchewan
Designated places in Saskatchewan
Organized hamlets in Saskatchewan
Division No. 1, Saskatchewan